The Callers of Newcastle was a golf tournament on the European Tour in 1977 named for its sponsor, the Callers department store. It was held at Whitley Bay Golf Club in Whitley Bay, England.

The tournament was won by South Africa's John Fourie, who defeated Peter Butler, Ángel Gallardo and Tommy Horton in a four way playoff. The playoff started at the 16th hole. Butler and Horton bogeyed the first extra hole and Fourie won at the next after he made a par 3,

Winners

References

External links
Coverage on the European Tour's official site

Former European Tour events
1977 establishments in England
Golf tournaments in England
Defunct sports competitions in England